is a French game show broadcast since 29 October 2007 on the channel Gulli and presented by .

It oppose two families, composed of an adult and of two children (who aren't obligatorily brothers and sisters) and who come in confrontation between four rounds, two being pointed on the leisure, the two others on the general knowledge. At the end of the fourth round, the family having scored most of points must confront the redoubtable Dark Box ( in French).

References

French game shows
French children's television series